Jerome Tang (born October 7, 1966) is a Trinidadian-American college basketball coach who is the head coach for the Wildcats of Kansas State University. He had previously been an assistant coach under Scott Drew from 2003 to 2022 at Baylor, where the Bears won the 2021 NCAA Championship.

Early life
Tang was born in San Fernando, Trinidad and Tobago. He moved with his parents to St. Croix in the U.S. Virgin Islands, living there until age 10 when his family relocated to Texas. Tang first attended North Central Bible College in Minneapolis, Minnesota, and then studied at home via online learning with Charter Oak State College over the Internet, and earned a bachelor's degree in 2007.

Coaching career

High school and assistant
Between 1993 to 2003, Tang served as head coach of Heritage Christian Academy in Cleveland, Texas, turning the team into a strong contender. While at Heritage Christian, he coached future NBA player Von Wafer. Tang was hired as an assistant coach at Baylor in 2003 under first-year coach Scott Drew. In 2017, Tang was promoted to associate head coach, and he helped lead Baylor to a national championship in 2021.

Kansas State
On March 21, 2022, Tang was named head coach of the Kansas State Wildcats, replacing the retiring Bruce Weber. Tang agreed to a six-year deal worth $14.1 million with the Wildcats.

Personal life
Tang is married with a son and a daughter. He is a Christian. His father is half Black and half Chinese and his mother is Indian.

Head coaching record

References

1966 births
Living people
Baylor Bears men's basketball coaches
Charter Oak State College alumni
College men's basketball head coaches in the United States
High school basketball coaches in Texas
Kansas State Wildcats men's basketball coaches
People from San Fernando, Trinidad and Tobago